Inka Wasi (Quechua inka Inca, wasi house, "Inca house", hispanicized spellings Inca Huasi, Incahuasi)  is a Bolivian river in the Chuquisaca Department, Nor Cinti Province. It is a left tributary of the Pilaya River, an important right affluent of the Pillku Mayu.

See also

List of rivers of Bolivia
 Puka Pampa River
 Tumusla River

References

Rivers of Chuquisaca Department